Colby Steven Corino (born August 28, 1996) is an American professional wrestler currently signed to WWE. Corino is best known for his time with Ring of Honor (ROH) and has wrestled for NWA as well as various independent promotions including PWF, PWX, CWF Mid-Atlantic Wrestling, DPW, and Catalyst Wrestling where he is the current Heavyweight champion. He is the son of former NWA World Heavyweight Champion and ECW World Heavyweight Champion, Steve Corino.

Alongside Lance Lude and Rob Killjoy, he is a former member of The Ugly Ducklings stable.

Professional wrestling career
Corino signed a contract with Ring of Honor in 2014 and debuted soon after, joining The Decade and aligning himself with B. J. Whitmer, Jimmy Jacobs and Adam Page as their "young boy". The addition of Corino to The Decade caused friction between Whitmer and Jacobs, leading to a match between the two at Supercard of Honor IX, won by Whitmer in what would go on to be Jacobs' final match in Ring Of Honor. After Jacobs' departure, as part of the young boy storyline, Whitmer would regularly berate, embarrass and even attack Corino in front of his father, then-color commentator and former professional wrestler Steve Corino. Whitmer disbanded the stable in 2016.

In early 2016, Corino participated in the ROH Top Prospect Tournament. He competed in the first round on January 9, where he was eliminated by Punisher Martinez.

On November 17, 2016, it was announced Corino would be joining the New Japan Pro-Wrestling Dojo to train as a young lion.

Alongside his Ugly Duckling stablemates, Corino made a guest appearance in the TNA special Total Nonstop Deletion, as part of the Tag Team Apocalypto. He was quickly eliminated by Decay (Abyss and Crazzy Steve).

WWE 2020, 2023–present

Colby appeared on the August 17, 2020 edition of WWE RAW Underground, losing to Erik of the Viking Raiders as well as the September 4 edition of 205 Live against Mansoor.

On February 18, 2023, it was reported that Colby had officially signed with WWE.

Championships and accomplishments
 America's Most Liked Wrestling
AML Prestige Championship (1 time)
Atomic Championship Wrestling
ACW Cruiserweight Championship (1 time)
  Capitol Wrestling / Catalyst Wrestling
 Capitol Wrestling Heavyweight Championship / Catalyst Wrestling Heavyweight Championship (1 time)
 National Wrestling Alliance
Champions Series Tournament (2021) – with Trevor Murdoch, Jax Dane, Jennacide and The Masked Mystery Man
H2O Wrestling: Hardcore Hustle Organization
H2O Heavyweight Championship (1 time)
 Krossfire Wrestling
KFW Championship (1 time)
 Premier Wrestling Federation
PWF Junior Heavyweight Championship (3 times)
PWF Universal Six Man Tag Team Championship (1 time) – with Lance Lude and Rob Killjoy
PWF Unified Tag Team Championship (2 times) – with Andrew Everett (1) and NINA (1)
PWF Crystal Coast Oceanic Championship (1 time)
Iron J Tournament (2014)
Lil' Sebastian Memorial Premier Tag League Tournament (2021) - with NINA
Oceanic XII Tournament (2021)
Most Popular Wrestler of the Year Award (2014)
Match of the Year Award (2015, 2021)
MVP Award (2020)
Pro Wrestling World-1
World-1 U-30 Open-weight Championship (1 time)
World-1 Tag Team Championship (1 time) – with Steve Corino
 Pro Wrestling Illustrated
 Ranked No. 226 of the top 500 singles wrestlers in the PWI 500 in 2022
Ring Wars Carolina
RWC Junior Heavyweight Championship (1 time)
Vanguard Championship Wrestling
VCW Commonwealth Heritage Championship (2 times)

References

External links
 
 

1996 births
Living people
21st-century professional wrestlers
American expatriate sportspeople in Canada
American male professional wrestlers
Professional wrestlers from Pennsylvania
Sportspeople from Philadelphia